The North Island is the northern island of mainland New Zealand.

North Island may also refer to:

Africa
 North Island, African Banks, an uninhabited island in the Seychelles
 North Island, Seychelles, a resort island in the Seychelles
 North Island, Kenya, an island on Lake Turkana, Kenya

Asia
 Severny Island, the northern of the two large islands of Novaya Zemlya in the Russian Arctic
 Zhifu Island or North Island, an islet in Shandong, China

Oceania
 North Island, Hawaii, an American island near Midway Atoll
 North Island (Houtman Abrolhos), an island off Western Australia
 North Island (rugby union), a New Zealand rugby football team
 North Island (Mangrove Islands), an island of Western Australia
 North Island (Titi/Muttonbird Islands), one of the Titi/Muttonbird Islands off New Zealand
 North Island (Torres Strait), one of the Australia's Torres Strait Islands

North America
 North Island (Alaska), an island in Whitewater Bay
 "North Island" in British Columbia, Canada refers to the northern half of Vancouver Island
 North Island (provincial electoral district), a provincial electoral district on Vancouver Island, British Columbia, Canada
 North Island—Powell River, a defunct federal electoral district on Vancouver Island, British Columbia, Canada
 Naval Air Station North Island, a United States Navy base in San Diego, California
 North Island, South Carolina, an island of the United States

See also
 Ile du Nord, Tasmania
 South Island (disambiguation)

ka:ჩრდილოეთი კუნძული
ru:Северный#Острова